Homoeogryllus is a genus of cricket in the subfamily Cachoplistinae and tribe Homoeogryllini.  The recorded distribution is: Africa and Peninsular Malaysia.

Species
Some species, previously placed here are now in the genus Meloimorpha.  The Orthoptera Species File lists:
 Homoeogryllus adunctus Gorochov, 1988
 Homoeogryllus ambo Gorochov, 2018
 Homoeogryllus cavicola Chopard, 1950
 Homoeogryllus deviatus Desutter-Grandcolas, 1985
 Homoeogryllus gabonensis Desutter-Grandcolas, 1985
 Homoeogryllus longicornis (Walker, 1869)
 Homoeogryllus lyristes Gorochov, 1988
 Homoeogryllus maroccanus Desutter-Grandcolas, 1985
 Homoeogryllus nigresculus Desutter-Grandcolas, 1985
 Homoeogryllus nigripennis Chopard, 1942
 Homoeogryllus orientalis Desutter-Grandcolas, 1985
 Homoeogryllus parvus Chopard, 1936
 Homoeogryllus reticulatus (Fabricius, 1781)
 Homoeogryllus tessellatus (Serville, 1838)
 Homoeogryllus venosus Saussure, 1878
 Homoeogryllus xanthographus Guérin-Méneville, 1847 – type species (as Homaeogryllus xanthographus)

References

External links
 
 

Ensifera genera
crickets
Orthoptera of Africa
Orthoptera of Asia